Cozyptila is a genus of crab spiders that was first described by Y. M. Marusik, Pekka T. Lehtinen & M. M. Kovblyuk in 2005.  it contains three species, found in Europe and on Cyprus: C. blackwalli, C. guseinovorum, and C. nigristernum.

See also
 List of Thomisidae species

References

Further reading

Araneomorphae genera
Spiders of Asia
Taxa named by Pekka T. Lehtinen
Thomisidae